"This Train Don't Stop There Anymore" is the final track on Elton John's 2001 album Songs from the West Coast. Written by John and Bernie Taupin, the song's lyrics details John's fame being over and his coming to terms with getting older but still keep touring and giving great performances around the world. It was released as the second single from the album and reached No. 24 in the UK Singles chart and was a Top 10 Adult Contemporary chart hit in the US. The song was less successful in the Netherlands, reaching only at No. 83.

The arrangement of the song was simple, a throwback to John's early piano-bass-drums combination prior to the arrival of guitarist Davey Johnstone to his band. John played this song and "American Triangle" on his concerts months before the album's release and at the Songs from the West Coast Tour in 2001–2002. After the tour ended, John performed this song on various locations until 2004.

Music video
The music video, directed by David LaChapelle with Pierre Rouger as cinematographer, presents a younger John played by Justin Timberlake dressed in outfits typical of John in the 1970s; the video also features Paul Reubens of Pee-Wee Herman fame as John Reid, John's manager of 25 years.

Personnel
Elton John – piano, vocals
Paul Bushnell – bass, backing vocals
Matt Chamberlain – drums 
Gary Barlow – backing vocals
Nigel Olsson – backing vocals
Paul Buckmaster – string arrangements

Covers
Country music artists Rosanne Cash and Emmylou Harris covered the song for the 2018 tribute album Restoration: Reimagining the Songs of Elton John and Bernie Taupin.

Track listing

UK CD Single #1
 "This Train Don't Stop There Anymore" – 4:39
 "Did Anybody Sleep With Joan of Arc" – 4:18
 "I Want Love (Live)" – 4:34

UK CD Single #2
 "This Train Don't Stop There Anymore" – 4:39
 "American Triangle (Live)" – 4:35
 "Philadelphia Freedom (Live)" – 5:08

Alternate Version
 "This Train Don't Stop There Anymore" – 4:39
 "Did Anybody Sleep With Joan of Arc" – 4:18
 "I Want Love (Live)" – 4:34
 "Philadelphia Freedom (Live)" – 5:08

Charts

References

2002 singles
Elton John songs
Music videos directed by David LaChapelle
Songs with music by Elton John
Songs with lyrics by Bernie Taupin
2001 songs
The Rocket Record Company singles